Benson Luk Hon-man is a Hong Kong businessman and BPA politician who has been a member of the Legislative Council for the Election Committee constituency which was newly created under the electoral overhaul imposed by Beijing.

On 5 January 2022, Carrie Lam announced new warnings and restrictions against social gathering due to potential COVID-19 outbreaks. One day later, it was discovered that Luk attended a birthday party hosted by Witman Hung Wai-man, with 222 guests.  At least one guest tested positive with COVID-19, causing many guests to be quarantined.

Electoral history

References 

Living people
Year of birth missing (living people)
HK LegCo Members 2022–2025
Hong Kong pro-Beijing politicians